Julia Janelle Letlow (née Barnhill; born March 16, 1981) is an American politician and academic administrator serving as the U.S. representative for Louisiana's 5th congressional district since 2021. Letlow is the first Republican woman to represent Louisiana in the House.

Early life and education 
Letlow was born Julia Janelle Barnhill on March 16, 1981, in Monroe, Louisiana. She graduated from Ouachita Christian High School. She earned her Bachelor of Arts and Master of Arts in speech communications from the University of Louisiana at Monroe, followed by a Doctor of Philosophy in communications from the University of South Florida in 2012. Her doctoral advisor was Jane Jorgenson. Letlow's dissertation was titled Giving Meaning to Grief: the Role of Rituals and Stories in Coping with Sudden Family Loss. She dedicated it to her brother, Jeremy, who died in an automobile collision.

Early career 
Letlow worked as director of education and patient safety for Tulane University School of Medicine. In 2018, she was named director of external affairs and strategic communications for the University of Louisiana at Monroe (ULM). In 2020, she was a finalist for the presidency of ULM.

U.S. House of Representatives

Elections

2021 Special 

Julia decided to run in the special election for the vacant seat in January 2021. During her campaign, she secured a number of high-profile endorsements, including one from former President Donald Trump. By the end of February, Letlow had raised $683,000, the most money raised by any candidate in the race. On March 20, she received over 64% of the vote in the nonpartisan blanket primary, winning the election outright and avoiding a runoff. Letlow is the first Republican woman elected to Congress from Louisiana.

Tenure 
She was sworn in on April 14. On August 12, 2022, Letlow voted against the Inflation Reduction Act of 2022.

Committee assignments
Committee on Appropriations
Subcommittee on Agriculture, Rural Development, Food and Drug Administration, and Related Agencies
Subcommittee on State, Foreign Operations, and Related Programs

Political positions

Immigration 
Letlow released a statement criticizing the Biden administration for "immigration detainees being released" in Louisiana, writing, "I join my fellow members of the Louisiana delegation in demanding a thorough and complete explanation of this situation and urge the Administration to stop these releases immediately".

Infrastructure 
In July 2021, Letlow told KNOE-TV that there was "Nothing like a pandemic to bring to light how vital rural broadband is to our district", and said that rural broadband can provide better access to quality healthcare and education. KNOE wrote that Letlow still did not commit to supporting the infrastructure plan proposed by Joe Biden, with Letlow arguing that "You know, it’s the political football... I really want to make sure that that infrastructure bill addresses true infrastructure needs. Roads, bridges, ports, rural broadband. Cut the other part out."

2020 presidential election 
Letlow said she would have joined the majority of Republican representatives in objecting the results of the 2020 presidential election in Congress, had she been in office at the time.

Personal life 
Letlow met her former husband in high school and they married in 2013. She had two children with him. Letlow addressed vaccine hesitancy among Republicans and encouraged them to get the COVID-19 vaccine, invoking her husband's death from the virus.

Letlow is a Presbyterian.

Electoral history

Notes

References

External links
Representative Julia Letlow official U.S. House website
 Representative Julia Letlow Campaign website

 
 

|-

1981 births
21st-century American politicians
21st-century American women politicians
American academic administrators
American Presbyterians
Christians from Louisiana
Female members of the United States House of Representatives
Living people
Presbyterians from Louisiana
Politicians from Monroe, Louisiana
Protestants from Louisiana
Republican Party members of the United States House of Representatives from Louisiana
University of Louisiana at Monroe alumni
University of South Florida alumni
Women academic administrators
Women in Louisiana politics